Moon Lake is a lake in Douglas County, Minnesota, in the United States.

Moon Lake was named from the resemblance of its outline to the crescent shape of the Moon.

See also
List of lakes in Minnesota

References

Lakes of Minnesota
Lakes of Douglas County, Minnesota